Alvin Davis Garten (June 20, 1905 – July 3, 1981) was an American football and basketball coach. He served two stints as the head football coach at Eastern New Mexico University in Portales, New Mexico, from 1936 to 1937 and again from 1939 to 1953, compiling a record of 66–62–4. Garten was also the head basketball coach at Eastern New Mexico for 26 seasons, tallying a mark of 273–352. The school did not field football or basketball teams from 1942 through 1944 because of World War II.

References

External links
 

1905 births
1981 deaths
College men's basketball head coaches in the United States
Eastern New Mexico Greyhounds football coaches
Eastern New Mexico Greyhounds men's basketball coaches